Ali Mirzaei (born 9 October 1942) is a retired Iranian football player. He played one match against Germany at the 1964 Summer Olympics, where Iran lost 0–4. Domestically he played for Paykan F.C.

References

External links
 

1942 births
Living people
Iranian footballers
Olympic footballers of Iran
Footballers at the 1964 Summer Olympics
Association football defenders
Paykan F.C. players